In organic chemistry, cyanopolyynes are a family of organic compounds with the chemical formula  (n = 3,5,7,…) and the structural formula  (n = 1,2,3,…). Structurally, they are polyynes with a cyano group  covalently bonded to one of the terminal acetylene units. 

A rarely seen group of molecules both due to the difficulty in production and the unstable nature of the paired groups, the cyanopolyynes have been observed as a major organic component in interstellar clouds. This is believed to be due to the hydrogen scarcity of some of these clouds. Interference with hydrogen is one of the reason for the molecule's instability due to the energetically favorable dissociation back into hydrogen cyanide and acetylene.

Cyanopolyynes were first discovered in interstellar molecular clouds in 1971 using millimeter wave and microwave telescopes. Other derivatives such as methylcyanoacetylene  and ethylcyanoacetylene  have been observed as well. The simplest example is cyanoacetylene, H−C≡C−C≡N. Cyanoacetylene is more common on Earth and it is believed to be the initial reagent for most of the photocatalyzed formation of the interstellar cyanopolyynes. Cyanoacetylene is one of the molecules that was produced in the Miller–Urey experiment and is expected to be found in carbon-rich environments.

Identification is made through comparison of experimental spectrum with spectrum gathered from the telescope. This is commonly done with measurement of the rotational constant, the energy of the rotational transitions, or a measurement of the dissociation energy. These spectra can either be generated ab initio from a computational chemistry program or, such as with the more stable cyanoacetylene, by direct measurement of the spectra in an experiment. Once the spectra are generated, the telescope can scan within certain frequencies for the desired molecules. Quantification can be accomplished as well to determine the density of the compounds in the cloud.

Hypothesized formation
The formation of cyanopolyynes in interstellar clouds is time-dependent. The formation of cyanopolyyne was studied and the abundances calculated in the dark cloud TMC-1. In the early days of the TMC-1, the governing reactions were ion–molecule reactions. During this time cyanoacetylene, formed through a series of ion-neutral reactions, with the final chemical reaction being:

C3H2 + N -> HC3N + H

However, for time after 10,000 years the dominant reactions were neutral–neutral reactions and two reaction mechanisms for the formation of cyanopolyynes became possible.

 HCN + C2H2 -> HC3N
 C_\mathit{n}H2{} + CN -> HC_{\mathit{n}+1}N{} + H 

The reaction mechanism that occurs in the present day depends on the environment of the cloud. The calculations by Winstanley show that photoionization and dissociation reactions play a profound role in the abundances of cyanopolyynes after about 1 million years. However, the fractional abundances of cyanopolyyne are less affected by changes in radiation field intensity past time 1 million years because the prevailing neutral-neutral reactions surpass the effects of photoreactions.

Detection in interstellar medium

Cyanopolyynes are relatively common in interstellar clouds, where they were first detected in 1971. As with many other molecules the cyanopolyynes are detected with a spectrometer which records the quantum energy levels of the electrons within the atoms. This measurement is done with a source of light which passes through the desired molecule. The light interacts with the molecule and can either absorb the light or reflect it, as not all light behaves the same way. This separates the light into a spectrum with alterations due to the molecule in question. This spectrum is recorded by a computer which is able to determine which wavelengths of the spectrum have been altered in some way. With the wide range of light affected the wavelengths can be determined by looking for spikes in the spectrum. The detection process usually happens within the outer ranges of the electromagnetic spectrum, usually in infrared or radio waves.

The spectrum is able to show the energy of the rotational state due to the wavelengths that are absorbed by the molecule; using these rotational transitions the energy level of each electron can be shown to determine the identity of the molecule. Rotational transitions can be determined by this equation:

where
 is the rotational distortion constant for the vibrational ground state
 is the centrifugal distortion constant for the vibrational ground state
 is the total angular momentum quantum number

This shows that the rotational distortion of an atom is related to the vibrational frequency of the molecule in question. With this ability to detect the cyanopolyynes these molecules have been recorded in several places around the galaxy. Such places include the atmosphere on Titan and the gas clouds that are within nebulae and the confines of dying stars.
 
For a while,  held the record as the largest molecule detected in interstellar space, but its identification was challenged.

See also
Diacetylene, H−C≡C−C≡C−H

References

Nitriles
Polyynes